Jean IV de Noyelles (born c. 1365 - died 25 October 1415) was a French nobleman and knight. 

De Noyelles was born to Hugues III de Noyelles, vicomte de Calonne, and Louise d'Inchy, dame de Beaupré. He was killed at the Battle of Agincourt along with his two brothers Pierre de Noyelles, de Calonne and Lancelot de Noyelles, de Calonne.

References 

1365 births
1415 births
French knights
People of the Hundred Years' War
Medieval French nobility
1415 deaths